Francesa Sarah (16th-century), was a Jewish mystic. She is described in the Sefer ha-Ḥezyonot ("The Book of Visions") by Hayyim Vital. She was a holy woman in the early Sabbateanism in Safed, and unique in Jewish religious history as the only woman regarded to have had a magid, an angelic spirit with the ability to foretell the future. A magid was, in accordance with belief, granted only to very select few among the highest scholars, and she was the only woman credited such. She is depicted as extremely wise and righteous, and made several famed prophesies.

See also
 Rachel Aberlin

References 
 Emily Taitz, Sondra Henry & Cheryl Tallan,  The JPS Guide to Jewish Women: 600 B.C.E.to 1900 C.E., 2003

People from Safed
16th-century Jews from the Ottoman Empire
16th-century religious leaders
Jewish mysticism
16th-century women from the Ottoman Empire
16th-century births
Sabbateans
Clairvoyants
Year of death unknown
Jewish women
Jews in Ottoman Palestine